Eaton Park is an unincorporated community in Polk County, Florida, United States. Eaton Park has a post office with ZIP code 33840.

References

Unincorporated communities in Polk County, Florida
Unincorporated communities in Florida
Former census-designated places in Polk County, Florida
Former census-designated places in Florida